Vesna  Jelić  (born  in Novo Mesto), is a former Croatian female volleyball player. She was part of the Croatia women's national volleyball team.

Career
She competed with the national team at the 2000 Summer Olympics in Sydney, Australia, finishing 7th.

Family
Vesna is the sister of volleyball player Barbara Jelić who was also part of the Croatian team at the 2000 Summer Olympics. 
They are the daughters of volleyball player Ivica Jelić who was the head coach of the Croatian team in 2000 and played for the Yugoslav team at the 1980 Summer Olympics.

See also
 Croatia at the 2000 Summer Olympics

References

External links

1982 births
Living people
Croatian women's volleyball players
Croatian people of Slovenian descent
Volleyball players at the 2000 Summer Olympics
Olympic volleyball players of Croatia
Galatasaray S.K. (women's volleyball) players